Pulse! was a tabloid magazine published by Tower Records (under the direction of VP of Publishing Mike Farrace) which contained record reviews, interviews and advertising.

History and profile
Pulse! was started in 1983. The magazine was published on a monthly basis. Initially, it was given away free in their stores to promote their record sales.

In 1992, Pulse! began national distribution with a cover price of $2.95. 

Pulse! was cancelled in 2002 when the company discontinued U.S. operations. The last of the 222 issues appeared in December 2002.

References

Monthly magazines published in the United States
Music magazines published in the United States
Free magazines
Defunct magazines published in the United States
Magazines established in 1983
Magazines disestablished in 2002